Peripatopsis purpureus is a species of velvet worm in the family Peripatopsidae.  This species is a clade in the P. balfouri species complex. Males of this species have 17 clawed legs with the last pair highly reduced, whereas females have a complete foot with claws on the reduced leg. Specimens range from 17 mm to 25 mm in length. Named for its purple-blue color, this species is found in the Western Cape Province of South Africa.

References

Endemic fauna of South Africa
Onychophorans of temperate Africa
Onychophoran species
Animals described in 2013